Novokharkovka is a rural locality (a sloboda) and the administrative center of Novokharkovskoye Rural Settlement, Olkhovatsky District, Voronezh Oblast, Russia. The population was 805 as of 2010. There are 6 streets.

Geography 
Novokharkovka is located 13 km north of Olkhovatka (the district's administrative centre) by road. Rakovka is the nearest rural locality.

References 

Rural localities in Olkhovatsky District